Every Breath You Take, also known as You Belong to Me, is a 2021 psychological thriller film directed by Vaughn Stein and written by David Murray. It stars Casey Affleck, Michelle Monaghan, Sam Claflin, and Veronica Ferres. It follows a psychiatrist whose life is disrupted after a client's brother who, after the client's death, insinuates himself into the psychiatrist's family. 

It was released on April 2, 2021, by Vertical Entertainment.

Plot
Philip Clark (Casey Affleck) is a psychiatrist who lives a strained, distant life with his wife Grace (Michelle Monaghan) and daughter Lucy (India Eisley), who are all struggling to cope with grief associated with the death of the younger child, Evan, after a car accident three years prior.

Among Philip's clients is Daphne Flagg (Emily Alyn Lind), a young depressive woman recovering from an abusive relationship, which she was able to leave with the support of Philip's therapy. Daphne is writing a book about her struggle with mental illness.

One afternoon, Philip receives a call from Daphne, who tells him that her best friend Joan has been killed in a hit-and-run accident. Later, Daphne is found dead outside her home, which the police believe to be suicide. Philip comforts her estranged British brother, James Flagg (Sam Claflin), who arrives at the scene extremely distraught. The next evening, James drops by Philip's house to drop off a book that Daphne had borrowed; sympathetic, Grace invites him to stay for dinner. Philip learns that James has written several books and is interested in buying one called Shadow Cast, which will take two weeks to arrive.

Dr. Vanessa Fanning (Veronica Ferres) confronts Philip for the unconventional methods he employed to help Daphne, which included confiding in her, things he had never shared with his family. Grace meets up with James to discuss selling his sister's house. She tells him that despite Philip's profession, he has been unable to address the pain of losing Evan and, as a result, the couple has become alienated from each other and from Lucy. Philip soon notices an inappropriate connection between his wife and James and asks James to stay away. Grace secretly goes to see James again and, despite her attempts to break off their relationship, they have sex.

James files a formal complaint against Philip with the Washington Board of Psychiatry, and Philip is suspended from his practice until it is fully investigated. James also befriends Lucy, who has a history of discipline and drug problems stemming from her grief over losing her brother, and they soon form a romantic connection. Lucy expresses a desire to run away, and he persuades her to pack her bags so they can do so together, but then later ignores her phone calls, leaving her heartbroken.

When Grace's car breaks down, James conveniently appears and offers her a ride home. He purposely misses a turn and begins driving erratically, then knocks Grace unconscious as she attempts to alert Philip. Philip chases them down and saves Grace. Back at home, they tell Lucy that James is a dangerous man but she does not believe them, obsessed by her idea of their relationship. Philip receives a call from Dr. Toth who tells him that James admitted himself to a psychiatry facility due to auditory hallucinations. Philip visits James who admits that he read Daphne's notes about her therapy with Philip, and about Philip's family background. As he is escorted back into his cell, James maniacally tells Philip that he "still smells" Grace.

Philip finally receives Shadow Cast and sees the real James Flagg on the back cover, exposing the James they have all met as an American man called Eric Dalton, Daphne's abusive ex-boyfriend. Philip discovers that Eric is psychotic; he killed Joan to make Daphne distraught in hopes that she would return to him, and when she didn't, he murdered Daphne. Philip realizes Eric has been taunting his family because Philip had helped Daphne end her relationship with Eric. Philip calls Dr. Toth to order him to lock Eric down, but Eric has already escaped after killing security guards. 

Realizing that Eric is going after Lucy, Philip and Grace race back to their house. Eric attacks Lucy and, after a violent struggle, Grace kills him with the blade of Evan's old ice-skating boot.  The three embrace as the police sirens approach.

Cast
 Casey Affleck as Phillip Clark
 Michelle Monaghan as Grace Watson
 Sam Claflin as James Flagg / Eric Dalton
 Veronica Ferres as Dr. Vanessa Fanning
 Emily Alyn Lind as Daphne Flagg
 India Eisley as Lucy Watson
 Hiro Kanagawa as Dr. Toth
 Vincent Gale as Stuart Fanning
 Lilly Krug as Lilly Fanning
 Brenden Sunderland as Evan

Production
In June 2012, it was announced Rob Reiner would direct the film, at that time titled You Belong to Me, from a screenplay by David Murray. In October 2012, it was announced Harrison Ford and Zac Efron had joined the cast of the film. In October 2019, it was announced Casey Affleck, Michelle Monaghan, Sam Claflin and Veronica Ferres were cast in the film, and that Christine Jeffs would be directing. In December 2019, it was announced Vaughn Stein would replace Jeffs as director who dropped out.

Filming
Principal photography began in Vancouver in December 2019.

Release
In March 2021, Vertical Entertainment acquired distribution rights to the film, and set its release in US theaters and on VOD for April 2, 2021.

Reception

Box office
Every Breath You Take grossed a worldwide total of $338,771.

Critical response
The film received largely negative reviews from critics. On review aggregator Rotten Tomatoes, the film holds a 20% approval rating based on 41 reviews, with an average rating of 4.2/10. The website's critics consensus reads: "Despite the A-list talent involved, Every Breath You Take never amounts to much more than a thuddingly familiar psychological thriller". On Metacritic, the film holds a rating of 32 out of 100, based on eight critics, indicating "generally unfavorable reviews".

References

External links
 
 

2021 films
2021 psychological thriller films
American psychological thriller films
Films about psychiatry
Films shot in Vancouver
English-language German films
German psychological thriller films
Vertical Entertainment films
2020s English-language films
Films directed by Vaughn Stein
2020s American films